The 2011 Monza GP3 Series round was a GP3 Series motor race held on September 10 and 11, 2011 at Autodromo Nazionale Monza, Italy. It was the final round of the 2011 GP3 Series. The race supported the 2011 Italian Grand Prix.

Lotus ART was crowned Teams' Champion in Belgium, while in the Drivers' standings Valtteri Bottas, who held a five-point lead over his teammate James Calado before the round, with Nigel Melker, Alexander Sims and Adrian Quaife-Hobbs all having mathematically a chance, sealed the title with his victory in Race 1.

Classification

Race 1

Notes
 – Williamson was given a 10 place grid penalty for causing a collision during the practice session.
 – Mancinelli received a 3 place grid penalty for impeding Quaife-Hobbs during the practice session.

Race 2

Notes
 – Stanaway and Ghirelli were given a 10 place grid penalty for causing separate collisions during Race 1.
 – Calado received a drive through penalty in the last laps of the race for causing a collision, so the penalty became a 20-second addition to his race time.

Final standings

Drivers' Championship standings

Teams' Championship standings

 Note: Only the top five positions are included for both sets of standings.

See also 
 2011 Italian Grand Prix
 2011 Monza GP2 Series round

References

External links
GP3 Series official website: Results

Monza
Monza